Mosquito Gulf (Spanish: Golfo de los Mosquitos) is a gulf of the Caribbean Sea on the north coast of Panama, extending from the Valiente Peninsula in Bocas del Toro, past the north coast of Veraguas to the province of Colón, Panama.

It should not to be confused with the Mosquito Coast which is further north in Nicaragua and Honduras.

The Isla Escudo de Veraguas is the primary island in the gulf.

Mosquitos
Gulfs of the Caribbean Sea
Panamanian coasts of the Caribbean Sea